"They Got It Wrong" is a song by English rapper Lethal Bizzle. It features vocals from British rapper Wiley. It was released on 21 April 2013 for digital download in the United Kingdom. The song has peaked at number 74 on the UK Singles Chart.

Music video
A music video to accompany the release of "They Got It Wrong" was first released onto YouTube on 11 March 2013 at a total length of three minutes and eighteen seconds.

Track listings
 Digital download – single
 "They Got It Wrong"  [Edit] – 3:13
 "They Got It Wrong"  [Radio Edit] – 3:14
 "They Got It Wrong"  [Instrumental] – 3:12
 "They Got It Wrong"  [A cappella] – 3:16

 Digital download – remix
 "They Got It Wrong"  [Remix] – 4:42

Charts

Release history

References

2013 singles
Lethal Bizzle songs
Wiley (musician) songs
2013 songs
Songs written by Lethal Bizzle
Songs written by Wiley (musician)
Songs written by Diztortion